Vacuolar pathway:
Movement of water molecules in plant cells via the vacuoles located in the cytoplasm of the cell. The water molecules encounter high resistance however and as a result little flow usually occurs making this pathway insignificant, the Apoplast pathway and Symplast pathway being the major pathways for movement of water in plants.
Water moves by osmosis across the vacuoles of the cells of the root system. The water moves down a concentration gradient from the soil solution to the xylem. The vacuolar pathway can also be considered a symplast pathway. 

 Plant physiology